The Doherty Cup  also known as  Cambridge University Tournament is men's closed grass court tennis tournament founded in 1881 as the Cambridge University LTC Tournament, and held in Cambridge University Lawn Tennis Club, Cambridge, Cambridgeshire, England.

History
The Cambridge University LTC Tournament was originally founded in the 19th century, and first staged in May 1881, at the Cambridge University Lawn Tennis Club (f.1881), Cambridge, Cambridgeshire, England. This tournament was an open event for students of the University, but closed to other outside players. The first winner of the mens singles was Britain's Barclay Fowell Buxton. the men's event was known as the Doherty Cup from 1920 onward. The 1924 edition was won by Donald Ross Ruttnam who defeated the American player Jimmy Van Alen. In 2021 Michal Kaminski of Poland defeated Krishna Amin of India.

Finals
Incomplete Roll

Mens Singles

Doherty Cup

References

External links
 Official Site:Cambridge University Lawn Tennis Club

Grass court tennis tournaments
Tennis tournaments in England